Australian Young Labor, also known as the Young Labor Movement or simply Young Labor, is the youth wing of the Australian Labor Party (ALP) representing all ALP members aged between 15 to 26. The organisation operates as a federation with independently functioning branches in all Australian states and territories which serve under the relevant state or territory branch of the federal Labor Party, often coming together during national conferences and federal elections. Young Labor is the oldest continuously operating youth wing of any political party in Australian history, being founded in 1926.

Young Labor is very closely connected and integrated with its mother party, with many members of the organisation leading successful political careers after the fact. Former presidents of Young Labor have included NSW Premier Bob Carr, Federal Minister for Agriculture Tony Burke, Special Minister of State, Senator John Faulkner, Australian Workers Union National Secretary and current Member for Maribyrnong and former Federal Labor Leader Bill Shorten as well as various of state and federal ministers and MPs.

Formation
The Labor Guild of Youth was established in Victoria in 1926. The first provisional meeting of the ALP's Youth Council was held in 1948. By the 1960s most states had created young labor organisations, usually called the young labor association (YLA). In the early 1970s there was a move to set up a national organisation. In 1971 leaders of several state YLAs met in Adelaide to set up a national body. The first conference was held in Adelaide in early 1972 and Bob McMullin was elected as first national president. Australian Young Labor (AYL) was included in the definition of the ALP in 1973.

Ideology
Young Labor emulates many of the functions of the senior party. National and State conferences are held yearly where policy is submitted and debated by elected delegates and members of Young Labor.

Activities and roles
Young Labor is most active during state and federal elections, campaigning in marginal seats. The youth wing of the party may organise members to door knock an electorate or set up a stand in shopping centres to hand out political party notes. Members are  often also asked to 'letterbox' party advertising.

Each year Australian Young Labor holds a conference in a capital city. The conference is usually held at a university campus and typically features guest speakers from the ALP.

At the conference several positions are elected by delegates chosen from state branches. Fifteen executive positions are also elected. The National Young Labor President is a non-voting representative on the Australian Labor Party National Executive.

Organisation
Each state has its own branch of Young Labor, functioning as a party unit (referred to as New South Wales Young Labor, Victorian Young Labor, etc.).  Nationally, the branches are federated to the National organisation, which has its own President and executive.

Criticism and Controversy
On 8 December 2004, the Sydney Morning Herald published allegations that factional leaders within the Labor Party in New South Wales were “petty, faction obsessed and vindictive.” The article, authored by Aubrey Belford, then a member of the ALP and former editor of the Sydney University student paper, Honi Soit, laments a Young Labor dominated by factional infighting, “Put simply, the party culture encourages young people to devote their energy to pursuing objectives that ultimately have no impact on the real world, and to pursue them through ritual political violence.” 

On January 23, 2012, President of Queensland Young Labor, Chaiy Donati came under significant criticism following links to the United States Republican Party. Online news source Crikey reported that he helped anti-war and pro drug legalisation Republican candidate Ron Paul in his fight for the primaries in New Hampshire. Ron Paul came second to Mitt Romney on The Republican Party Ballot, and second to Barack Obama on The Democratic Party Ballot in New Hampshire. On his return to Queensland, numerous factional rivalries emerged between members. Despite this Chaiy Donati remained the rights factional leader and in 2013 secured Queenslands Kerrie Kahlon the Australian Young Labor Presidency.  Chaiy Donati later returned to the United States in April 2016, this time working on The Democratic Primaries for Bernie Sanders in a close Primary against Hillary Clinton.

In 2019, Nick Douros was elected National Secretary of AYL. Douros was formerly a staffer for David Smith (Australian Capital Territory politician) and ACT Young Labor President but resigned from both roles amidst allegations of bullying which were upheld by an internal disputes tribunal.

References

External links
Australian Young Labor official website
Australian Young Labor on Facebook

Youth wings of political parties in Australia
Australian labour movement
Australian Young Labor
Australian Labor Party
Australian Young Labor
1926 establishments in Australia